Thoroughfare Gap Battlefield is a historic American Civil War battlefield located at Thoroughfare Gap, Broad Run, Prince William County, Virginia. It was the site of the Battle of Thoroughfare Gap. The property includes a number of resources present at the time of the battle including the separately listed Beverley Mill, a five-story, coursed-rubble stone building set into the north side of Thoroughfare Gap. Meadowlands, the Chapman's house and the second Upper Mill are clearly visible on the landscape, as well as an important ice pit and a walled cemetery associated with the Chapman family.

It was listed on the National Register of Historic Places in 1999. The Civil War Trust (a division of the American Battlefield Trust) and its partners have acquired and preserved  of the battlefield. The battlefield is accessible from a walking trail adjacent to the ruins of Chapman's Mill, located north of Interstate 66 on Beverly Mill Drive. Sharpshooters used the mill's upper floor windows to defend the pass. Historic and wayside markers are placed along Virginia Route 55 just south of the mill.

References

External links
Meadowland (Ruins), State Route 55, near Beverley's Mill, Haymarket, Prince William County, VA: 1 photo at Historic American Buildings Survey

Battlefields of the Eastern Theater of the American Civil War
Historic American Buildings Survey in Virginia
Conflict sites on the National Register of Historic Places in Virginia
Buildings and structures in Prince William County, Virginia
National Register of Historic Places in Prince William County, Virginia
Virginia in the American Civil War